Poovum Pottum is 1968 Indian Tamil-language romantic drama film directed by Dada Mirasi and produced by Vasu Menon. The film stars S. V. Ranga Rao, A. V. M. Rajan, Muthuraman and Bhanumathi. It is a remake of the 1967 Hindi film Nai Roshni.

Plot

Cast 
Male cast
 S. V. Ranga Rao as Professor Raja Rathinam
 A. V. M. Rajan as Professor Prakash
 Muthuraman
 K. D. Santhanam
 Veerappan as Rickshaw puller
 Nagesh as Sukumar

Female cast
 P. Bhanumathi as Padmavathi
 Pandari Bai as Charu
 Bharathi as Amudha
 Jyothi Lakshmi as Chithra
 M. Bhanumathi as Kamala

Soundtrack 
Music was by R. Govardhanam and lyrics were written by A. Maruthakasi, Kannadasan and Vaali. The song "Nathaswara Osaiyile Devan" is set in Brindavani Sarang raga.

Reception 
Kalki appreciated the film for various aspects, including the writing and cast performances.

References

External links 
 

1968 romantic drama films
1960s Tamil-language films
Films based on works by Nihar Ranjan Gupta
Films set in Chennai
Indian black-and-white films
Indian romantic drama films
Tamil remakes of Hindi films